Thomas Francis Hickey (February 4, 1861 – December 10, 1940) was an American prelate of the Roman Catholic Church.  He served as the second bishop of the Diocese of Rochester in New York (1909–1928).

Biography

Early life 
Hickey was born in Rochester, New York on February 4, 1861, to Jeremiah and Margaret Hickey.  He studied at St. John's Seminary and Fordham University, both in New York City, and at St. Joseph's Seminary in Troy New York. 

Hickey was ordained to the priesthood on March 25, 1884.  After his ordination, he held pastoral positions in parishes in Geneva and Moravia, New York. Hickey then became chaplain of the New York State Industrial School in Rochester.  He was later appointed rector of St. Patrick's Cathedral in Rochester.

Coadjutor Bishop and Bishop of Rochester 
On February 18, 1905, Hickey was appointed as coadjutor bishop of the Diocese of Rochester and titular bishop of Berenice by Pope Pius X. He received his episcopal consecration on May 24, 1905, from Cardinal John Farley, with Bishops Bernard McQuaid and Patrick Ludden serving as co-consecrators.

Upon the death of Bishop McQuaid, Hickey automatically succeeded him as bishop of Rochester on January 18, 1909. During his tenure, Hickey was a strong advocate of Catholic education, and established a catechetical program for Catholic children enrolled in public schools. He supported the apostolate to deaf persons, pioneered the work of Catholic Charities within the diocese, and helped the bishops of New York State to establish an office to communicate with the state legislature about Catholic concerns.  Hickey led the creation of the Aquinas Institute for Boys for and Nazareth Academy for girls in Rochester, and the founding of Nazareth College in Pittsford, New York. 

Hickey's resignation as bishop of the Diocese of Rochester was accepted by Pope Pius XI on October 30, 1928; he was appointed titular archbishop of Viminacium on the same date.

Thomas Hickey died in Rochester of what was termed a "toxic condition" at St. Mary's Hospital on December 10, 1940, at age 79.

References

1861 births
1940 deaths
Saint Joseph's Seminary (Dunwoodie) alumni
Fordham University alumni
Religious leaders from Rochester, New York
Roman Catholic bishops in New York (state)
20th-century American Roman Catholic titular archbishops